Sven Christ (born 9 December 1973 in Biel/Bienne) is a Swiss football manager and former footballer.

Christ represented Swiss Super League side FC Aarau on three separate occasions. Christ left FC Aarau at the end of the 2007–08 season after his contract was not renewed by Polish coach Ryszard Komornicki.

References

External links
 

1973 births
Living people
People from Biel/Bienne
Swiss men's footballers
FC Grenchen players
FC Aarau players
Grasshopper Club Zürich players
FC Lausanne-Sport players
1. FSV Mainz 05 players
Swiss Super League players
2. Bundesliga players
FC Baden managers
FC Aarau managers
Association football defenders
Swiss football managers
Sportspeople from the canton of Bern